Bruce Henry Dennis Steane (22 June 1866 – 1938) was a British organist and composer of classical music.

Steane was born in Camberwell, London. He began playing the piano at the age of 3 and was a chorister at the St. Augustine's Church at Forest Hill at the age of 8. At the age of 12 he became assistant organist there and later studied organ at Dulwich College.

In his later years Bruce Steane was organist for example at St Mary Matfelon, Cuddington Parish Church, Kemsing Parish Church (from 1903), Seal's Parish Church, Swanley Convalescent Home St Bartholomew's Hospital (from 1905) and Combe Martin Parish Church (from 1918).

He composed around 400 compositions, mainly organ and sacred music, among them 100 anthems, 25 church services and 120 organ compositions. Steane also composed some chamber and orchestral music, and won several prizes for his compositions

Compositions

Organ
 Evensong for organ (1910)
 Imperial march, for organ
 Te Deum Laudamus in F, for organ
 A book of short Voluntaries, for organ
 Angelus for organ op.103
 Andante con moto, for organ
 Marche Triomphale

Anthems
 O give thanks unto the Lord
 I will not leave you comfortless
 Sing unto God
 Be merciful unto me, O God
 They that punt their trust in the Lord
 The Lord is my light and my salvation
 Rejoice, O je righteous
 Rise in joyfulness and splendour
 Bow down thine ear

Instrumental compositions
 Concert-Stück for violin op.285 (1913)
 Piano trio
 Romance for violin in D minor
 Symphony for orchestra Dreadnaught (performed 1911)
 Tone poem for orchestra Grimaldi
 Elegy for English horn and orchestra
 Tone poem for piano and orchestra (1914–15)
 La chute d'eau, for strings and wood wind

References

External links 
 

1866 births
1938 deaths
British classical organists
British male organists
British male classical composers
Male classical organists